Kushi is an upcoming Indian Telugu-language romantic comedy film  written and directed by Shiva Nirvana. Produced by Mythri Movie Makers, it stars Vijay Deverakonda and Samantha Ruth Prabhu. This film is scheduled to be released in 2023.

Cast 

 Vijay Deverakonda
 Samantha
 Jayaram
 Sachin Khedekar
 Murali Sharma
 Vennela Kishore
 Lakshmi
 Rohini
 Ali
 Rahul Ramakrishna
 Srikanth Iyengar
 Sharanya Pradeep

Production

Development 
In December 2019, it was announced that Shiva Nirvana would direct Vijay Deverakonda with Dil Raju producing it under Sri Venkateswara Creations. The film was then formally launched in April 2022, under the tentative title #VD11 with Mythri Movie Makers producing the film. In May 2022, the film's title was officially revealed to be Kushi.

Filming 
Principal photography commenced in April 2022. The first schedule that took place in Kashmir concluded in May 2022. The filming paused in June 2022 due to Samantha's illness.

Music 
The music and background score are composed by Hesham Abdul Wahab, who rose to fame with the soundtrack of Hridayam .

Release 
Kushi is scheduled to be theatrically released  in 2023 between January to April Telugu along with dubbed versions in Tamil, Kannada, and Malayalam languages. Makers have decided that now it will be released in Hindi as well.

References 

2020s Telugu-language films
Upcoming films
Upcoming Telugu-language films
Upcoming Indian films
2022 films
Films set in Kashmir
Films shot in Jammu and Kashmir
Indian romantic comedy films
Mythri Movie Makers films
Films directed by Shiva Nirvana